Harold R. Johnson ( 1957– February 9, 2022) was a Canadian indigenous lawyer and writer, whose book Firewater: How Alcohol Is Killing My People (And Yours) was a shortlisted nominee for the Governor General's Award for English-language non-fiction at the 2016 Governor General's Awards. The book, an examination of the problem with alcohol consumption among Canadian First Nations, draws on Johnson's work as a Crown prosecutor in northern Saskatchewan.

Johnson told CBC Radio interviewer Shelagh Rogers in 2016 that his father was a Swedish immigrant and his mother a Cree woman in Saskatchewan, where he was born.  He enlisted in the Royal Canadian Navy and worked as a logger, trapper and miner before going to university as an adult, completing his education in law with an MA at Harvard. He was a member of the Montreal Lake Cree Nation.

After being diagnosed with stage IV lung cancer, Johnson died on February 9, 2022, at the age of 64. His twelfth and final book, The Power of Story was released posthumously in October of the same year.

Bibliography

Fiction

 Billy Tinker (2001)
 Back Track (2005)
 Charlie Muskrat (2008)
 The Cast Stone (2011)
 Corvus (2015)
 The Björkan Sagas (2021) 

Nonfiction

 Two Families: Treaties and Government (2007)
 Firewater: How Alcohol is Killing My People (and Yours) (2016)
 Clifford (2018)
 Peace and Good Order: The Case for Indigenous Justice in Canada (2019)
 Cry Wolf: (2020)
 The Power of Story: On Truth, the Trickster, and New Fictions for a New Era

References

1950s births
2022 deaths
Year of birth missing
21st-century Canadian male writers
21st-century Canadian non-fiction writers
21st-century First Nations writers
First Nations lawyers
Writers from Saskatchewan
Cree people
Canadian male non-fiction writers
Harvard Law School alumni
 Canadian people of Swedish descent